Tampico is an unincorporated community in Darke County, in the U.S. state of Ohio.

History
Tampico was laid out in 1850. A post office called Tampico was established in 1850, and remained in operation until 1876. Tampico was originally built up exclusively by African Americans.

References

Unincorporated communities in Darke County, Ohio
Unincorporated communities in Ohio
Populated places established by African Americans